The Inhul is a left tributary of the Southern Bug (Boh) and is the 14th longest river of Ukraine. It flows through the Kirovohrad and Mykolaiv regions.

The river valley is mostly trapezium-like with a width of up to 4 km and a depth of up to 60 meters. At the upper stream it has a narrow winding channel that cuts through the Dnieper Upland, and its rocky banks show granite and gneiss; at the middle and lower stream after entering the Black Sea Lowland, it widens up to 30 meters and over. The river freezes over in December and thaws sometime in March.

Among major cities on the river are Kropyvnytskyi and Mykolaiv.

See also
 Inhul River Park

References

External links
 Sukhenko, O., Domaranskyi, A. Inhul. Majestic and terrible (Інгул. Величний і жахливий). The Ukrainian Week. 31 May 2017. (collection of photos)

Rivers of Kirovohrad Oblast
Rivers of Mykolaiv Oblast